The EHF European League is an annual men's handball club competition organised by the European Handball Federation (EHF) since 1981. It is the second-tier competition of European club handball, ranking only below the EHF Champions League. Previously called the EHF Cup, the competition will be known as the EHF European League from the season 2020–21. Portuguese side Benfica are the current holders.

History
It was formerly known as the IHF Cup until 1993. Also, starting from the 2012–13 season the competition has been merged with the EHF Cup Winners' Cup. The EHF coefficient rank decides, which teams have access and in which stage they enter.

Winners

IHF Cup

EHF Cup

EHF European League

Statistics

Winning clubs

Titles by country

Notes
Results until the Dissolution of the Soviet Union in 1991. One club from present day Ukraine won the title once and was runner-up another time, one club from present day Lithuania also won the title once and was runner-up another time, while one title and an additional one time runner-up were achieved by two clubs from present day Russia.
Results until the Breakup of Yugoslavia in the early 1990s. One Club from present day Bosnia and Herzegovina won the title once and another was runner-up  one time, while a club from present day Serbia was also runner-up one time.

See also
EHF Champions League
EHF European Cup

References

External links
Official website

 
European Handball Federation competitions
Recurring sporting events established in 1981
Multi-national professional sports leagues